Patent Bending is a Canadian reality television series that premiered August 22, 2006, on the Discovery Channel. The series is based on building some of the weird, fantastical ideas inventors have patented over the last century. Once physically realised, the flaws in these ideas tend to be humorously obvious and explain the ideas' lack of commercial success. The team then tries to come up with an improved version, thus the "bending" part of the title, meeting with varying results.

Episodes

See also
 MythBusters
 Prototype This!
 The Re-Inventors
 Smash Lab
 Doing DaVinci
 James May's Man Lab

References

External links
Patent Bending at The Internet Movie Database

Discovery Channel (Canada) original programming
2006 Canadian television series debuts
2006 Canadian television series endings
2000s Canadian reality television series